Football is one of the most popular sport in Kerala. Football was introduced to the land of Kerala during pre-independence period by British officers of the Malabar Special Police (MSP) in the 20th century. MSP was camped in Malappuram and soon the natives began adopting the sport, who played in post-harvest paddy fields. Kerala enjoyed a golden age from 1985 to 1995 by making it to Santhosh Trophy finals seven times consecutively, and football became an iconic sport ever since in the south Indian state. FIFA released the film Maitanam - The Story of Football in Kerala' quoting, football in the Indian State of Kerala runs through the fabric of its society, where "football is life and life is football". Travancore Royals Football Club (TRFC), founded on 29th November 2018, is India's first fans-owned club. 

Kerala state football team appeared in the Santosh Trophy finals 15 times, and have won the trophy 7 times, latest in 2022 by defeating Bengal in the final on 2 May at the Payyanadu Stadium in Malappuram. Gokulam Kerala FC won the 2020–21 I-League to become the first ever club from Kerala to win an I-League title and they created history by becoming the first team in the I-League era to defend its title, being 2021-22 I-League Champions. Gokulam Kerala FC is also the first club from Kerala to qualify for a continental competition, the AFC Cup. Kerala Blasters, the Indian Super League club based in Kochi are one of the most widely supported clubs in Asia and has one of the largest social media following among the football clubs from the continent.

Kerala Premier League is the official state level league tournament and Kerala State Club Football Championship is the official state level knockout tournament in Kerala, both organised by the Kerala Football Association. SBI Kerala FC is the most successful Kerala League team becoming champions 6 times while Travancore Titanium FC most successful in the Championship, winning it 10 times.

The Sait Nagjee Cup Football Tournament is a popular international club football tournament held in Kozhikode which has been attracting large crowd since 1952. Brazilian footballer Ronaldinho is the brand ambassador for the Sait Nagjee Football Tournament.

Clubs 
Most of the clubs still functioning in Kerala are founded after 1970s.

Stadiums

Notable players 

I M Vijayan, V. P. Sathyan, C. V. Pappachan, Jo Paul Ancheri, Victor Manjila, E.N. Sudhir, Mohammed Rafi, C.K. Vineeth, Anas Edathodika, Sahal Abdul Samad, Rino Anto, Rahul Kannoly Praveen, Ashique Kuruniyan, N.P Pradeep,  Krishnan Nair Ajayan, Zakeer Mundampara, Usman Ashik, Muhammed Sagar Ali, Denson Devadas, C. S. Sabeeth, Mohamed Irshad, Asif Kottayil, Sushanth Mathew.

Professional leagues 
1998-2007
Kerala Football League (KFL) / Kerala State Football League

2007-present
 Kerala Premier League  (KPL)

2021-present
 Kerala Premier League Qualfier (KPLQ)

Notable tournaments 
 Kerala State Club Football Championship
 Sait Nagjee Football Tournament: held in Kozhikode, Kerala
 GV Raja Trophy in Thiruvananthapuram
 Sevens football Malappuram
 Chakola Cup in Thrissur
 Golden Jubilee Trophy in Kollam
 Nehru Cup in Ernakulam
 Mamman Mappila Cup in Kottayam
 Sree Narayana Cup in Kannur

List of State level Champions

Football Academies 
 Milan Academy Kozhikode
 KBFC Young Blasters
 Gokulam Football Foundation
 Prathibha Football Club, Trivandrum
 Kovalam Football Club
 Valiyathura Football Academy
 KMHS Mevalloor, Kottayam
 Association of Promotion of Football Talents, Palakkad
 Beypore Football Academy, Kozhikode
 G.H.S.S, Nadakkavu, Kozhikkode
 Jawahar Sports & Arts Club, Mavoor, Kozhikkode
 V.P Sathyan Socker School, Kozhikode
 G.H.S.S, Udinoor Trikkarippur, Kasaragod

References 

Football in Kerala